Jeyran Aliyeva (born 3 January 1995) is an Azerbaijani volleyball player for Azerrail Baku and the Azerbaijani national team.

She participated at the 2017 Women's European Volleyball Championship.

References

1995 births
Living people
Azerbaijani women's volleyball players
Sportspeople from Baku
Liberos